The Cotton Futures Act of 1914 authorized the United States Department of Agriculture to establish physical standards as a means of determining color grade, staple length and strength, and other qualities and properties for cotton.  It was intended to minimize speculative manipulation of the cotton market.

The Act was rendered unconstitutional in Federal district court because it originated in the Senate. As a revenue act, it should have been drafted in the House. It was replaced by the Cotton Futures Act of 1916.

References

External links
 
 

1914 in American law
United States federal commodity and futures legislation
Cotton industry in the United States